Martin Gerhardt Banwell , Hon.FRSNZ (born 24 November 1954) is an organic chemist specialising in biotransformations and natural product synthesis.

His research interests involve the enzymatic preparation of organic molecules as synthons or building blocks for complex natural products. This technology/methodology is then applied to the synthesis of complex marine natural products from the Great Barrier Reef.

Career history

Martin was raised in a family friendly to China. His father, who worked for the United Nations as a consulting geophysicist, was most enthusiastic about Chinese culture and taught himself Mandarin. As a consequence, Martin has admired Chinese culture since early childhood. He received a BSc at Victoria University of Wellington in 1976, and an Honours, 1st Class from the same institution in 1977; his doctorate in 1979 is also from Victoria University, under the direction of Brian Halton.

Banwell relocated to Ohio State University between 1979–1980 to undertake a post-doctoral fellowship before taking on the role of Senior teaching Fellow at the Department of Organic Chemistry, University of Adelaide until 1981.

Banwell then returned to New Zealand taking the role of Lecturer in Chemistry at the University of Auckland until 1986, when he returned to Australia to take a similar role at the Department of Organic Chemistry at the University of Melbourne. In 1995 as an Associate Professor he moved to the Australian National University as a Senior Fellow. He was promoted to full professor in 1999.

Banwell has also previously been a guest at Swiss Federal Institute of Technology (ETH), Zürich, Switzerland.
Currently Prof. Banwell is a Foreign Visiting Researcher at Hiroshima University, an Asia-Pacific Representative, Advisory Board to the International Society for Heterocyclic Chemistry, a Chemistry Consultant for CSIRO Molecular Science and Member, Australian Research Council College of Experts.

Banwell currently serves on the editorial boards for several journals such as Tetrahedron.

Publications
To date Prof. Banwell has published 206 peer reviewed articles, 6 patents, 1 review and 1 non-refereed publication.

Fellowships and awards

Banwell has been awarded numerous Fellowships and Awards including;
 Rennie Medal of the Royal Australian Chemical Institute. (1986)
 Grimwade Prize in Industrial Chemistry from the University of Melbourne (1992)
 Elected Fellow of the Royal Australian Chemical Institute (FRACI). (1992)
 Royal Society of Chemistry (U.K.) International Author Travel Grant Awardee. (1998)
 Tasmanian Alkaloid Lectureship of the University of Tasmania (1998)
 Japan Society for the Promotion of Science Fellowship. (1999)
 Humboldt Research Awardee of the Alexander von Humboldt Foundation, Germany. (2000)
 Elected Honorary Fellow of the Royal Society of New Zealand. 2002: Conference Chair, 2002 Southern Highlands Conference on Heterocyclic Chemistry. (2002)
 Royal Society of Chemistry (UK)
 Royal Award in Synthetic Organic Chemistry (2003)
 Nanjing University of Science and Technology International Exchange and Co-operation Lecturer, Nanjing, China, 19–21 May 2004. (2004)
 2004 Boehringer Ingelheim Lecturer of the Ohio State University, 10 June, (2004).
 Elected fellow of the Australian Academy of Science. (2004)
 2004–2005 Novartis Chemistry Lecturer (2004)
 Birch Medal of the Royal Australian Chemical Institute (2004)
 2005 Merck Lecturer (UK) (2005)
 2018 awarded an Officer of the Order of Australia for "distinguished service to science education as an academic, author and researcher, particularly in the field of synthetic organic chemistry, to scientific institutes, and as a mentor of emerging scientists".

Representative publications

References

External links
 Banwell Group RSC homepage

1954 births
Academic staff of the Australian National University
Living people
New Zealand chemists
Academic staff of the University of Auckland
Academic staff of the University of Melbourne
Victoria University of Wellington alumni
Fellows of the Australian Academy of Science
Officers of the Order of Australia